The Fall of Every Man is a split EP featuring songs from hardcore punk bands Shai Hulud and Indecision, released on September 15, 1998, on the Revelation Records' subsidiary, Crisis Records, in CD and 10" clear green (230 pressed). It is now sold through Revelation Records. The Shai Hulud tracks were included in a remastered/remixed form in A Profound Hatred of Man (reissue).

Track listing
 "The Bonds of Those Who Have No Understanding of Consequence" – 2:28 (Shai Hulud)
 "Love Is the Fall of Every Man" – 2:34 (Shai Hulud)
 "When One Bests Defeat" – 2:42 (Shai Hulud)
 "How Far the Mighty Have Fallen" – 2:19 (Indecision)
 "Most Precious Blood" – 2:17 (Indecision)
 "Making People Apologize for Accusing You of Things You Actually Did" – 1:49 (Indecision)
 "Glue" – 1:14 (Indecision)

Credits

Shai Hulud line-up
Oliver Chapoy - guitar (The Sensitive Pimp)
Matt Fox - guitar (The World Devourer)
Chad Gilbert - voice (Peloquin)
Steve Kleisath - drum (Bizzarro)
Dave Silber - bass guitar (The Dane)

Indecision line-up
Justin Brannan -  guitar
Pat Flynn - drums
Steven Bago - bass guitar
Tom Sheehan - vocals
Rachel Susannah Rosen - guitar

Recorded at Studio 13 in May 1998 by Jeremy Staska

Shai Hulud albums
1998 EPs
Albums produced by Jeremy Staska
Split EPs